Try My Love may refer to:

 Try My Love (Jeremy Jordan album), 1993
 "Try My Love" (song), the title song
 Try My Love (Táta Vega album), 1978
 "Try My Love", by Stephanie Mills from Sweet Sensation, 1980